UN numbers from UN0401 to UN0500 as assigned by the United Nations Committee of Experts on the Transport of Dangerous Goods are as follows:


UN 0401 to UN 0500

See also 
Lists of UN numbers

References

External links
ADR Dangerous Goods, cited on 4 June 2015.
UN Dangerous Goods List from 2015, cited on 4 June 2015.
UN Dangerous Goods List from 2013, cited on 4 June 2015.

Lists of UN numbers